Seth Frederick "Bullet" Pal Jalosjos is a Filipino politician from the province of Zamboanga del Norte.

Family and personal life
He is the son of former First District Congressman Romeo G. Jalosjos, half-brother of Congressman Romeo "Jonjon" Jalosjos Jr. and sister of TV host and former Baliangao, Misamis Occidental mayor Svetlana Jalosjos-de Leon.

Outside of political life, he is a drummer, a sports enthusiast, a farmer, and a businessman. He was once romantically linked to former actress and model Nancy Castiglione.

Politics
Since belonging to a local political family, he made his political entry when he ran for Board Member of Zamboanga del Norte's First District in 2007. In 2010, he ran for and won as Congressman of the same district. He ran for reelection in 2013 and 2016, and won. In the 2019 local elections, he ran for governor of Zamboanga del Norte, but was defeated.

In the 2022 local elections, Jalosjos won as Mayor of Dapitan against then-Governor Roberto Uy.

Incidents and controversies

Incidents
On April 26, 2016, Jalosjos and his party mates were having a campaign in Barangay Poblacion, La Libertad, Zamboanga del Norte when gunshots were fired. Jalosjos, who was on his reelection bid that year, survived the assassination attempt with his party.

Controversies
Jalosjos and his cousin were accused of kidnapping and illegal detention of Milagros Ceriales and Rosita Jalosjos in 2019 after it was alleged that the victims were detained against their will at Dakak Park and Beach Resort, which is owned by the Jalosjos family. He was issued an arrest warrant on that matter, but his camp filed for a motion asking for "immediate deferment or recall of the warrant".

Electoral history

References

|-

|-

Bullet
Living people
Politicians from Zamboanga del Norte
People from Dapitan
Nacionalista Party politicians
Members of the House of Representatives of the Philippines from Zamboanga del Norte
Year of birth missing (living people)